The Day of the Siege: September Eleven 1683 (Italian: 11 Settembre 1683; Polish: Bitwa pod Wiedniem, literally: "The Battle of Vienna"; also released as Siege Lord 2: Day of the Siege) is a 2012 English-language Polish and Italian  historical drama film based on the 1683 Battle of Vienna and directed by Renzo Martinelli.  The film was released on 12 October 2012.

Plot
Beginning after the First Siege of Vienna the century before, the film brings viewers through the various conflicts between Catholic Christianity and Turkish Islam which led up to the events of 11 September 1683 and the Battle of Vienna. It shows the alleged circumstances of the 2nd siege of Vienna and the assault of Ottoman Turks led by Kara Mustafa (Enrico Lo Verso) against the Habsburg monarchy. The assault was stopped by King Jan III Sobieski (Jerzy Skolimowski), and curtailed Turkish expansion into European Christendom.

Cast
F. Murray Abraham as Marco d'Aviano
Enrico Lo Verso as Kara Mustafa
Jerzy Skolimowski as Jan III Sobieski
Alicja Bachleda  as Eleanor of Austria, Queen of Poland (Polish: Eleonora Habsburżanka)
Isabella Orsini as Leila
Andrea Iaia as Giovanni Cristofori
Piotr Adamczyk as Leopold I, Holy Roman Emperor (Polish: Leopold I Habsburg)
Cristina Serafini as Rosa Cristofori
Antonio Cupo as Charles V Duke of Lorraine
 Yorgo Voyagis as Abu'l
Daniel Olbrychski as Marcin Kazimierz Kątski
Borys Szyc as Mikołaj Sieniawski
Andrzej Seweryn as Jan Andrzej Morsztyn
Krzysztof Kwiatkowski as John George III 
Marius Chivu as Cosma
Giorgio Lupano as Count Ernst Rüdiger von Starhemberg
Marcin Walewski as Jakub "Fanfan" Sobieski
Wojciech Mecwaldowski as Jerzy Franciszek Kulczycki
Ștefan Iancu as Kara Mustafa's son
Matteo Branciamore as Prince Eugene of Savoy
Dan Cogalniceanu

Production
It took ten years to raise the film's $13,000,000 budget. In addition to the theatrical version, the filmmakers have prepared a longer version to be released on television as a mini-series. Filming began in April 2011, with support from backers in Austria, Poland and Italy, with RAI supporting with 5.8 million euro, and another million euro from the Friuli region.
 
The title's allusion to the 11 September 2001 attacks is intentional.  Director Martinelli explained that while that date is associated with the attacks on the United States, few people know that the date also marks the historical events of 1683 when 300,000 soldiers moved from Constantinople to Vienna with an intent to capture Rome and turn St. Peter's Basilica into a mosque. In reality, though, the Battle of Vienna (Schlacht am Kahlenberg) took place on 12 September 1683.

During production in June, it was first revealed that with a planned-for 13-week shooting schedule, the film would be using over 100 actors from Poland, the United States, Italy, Romania, Turkey, Greece, Spain, and France, over 10,000 extras and 3,000 horses in the battle scenes.  Filmmakers were unable to acquire permissions to use castle structures in Poland, and although interiors of Wilanów Palace were eventually used, castle exteriors were shot at Mantua, Lombardy, to represent that of King Jan III Sobieski.  
The film was shot entirely in English with intention for worldwide distribution.

Reception
While complaining that the film's special effects graphics resembled those of a low-resolution video game, Polityka noted that while based in the times and location of the Battle of Vienna, the film is not strictly historical, but is instead a fictional drama, like any other historical movie.

Home media
On 22 July 2014, Phase 4 Films released the film on DVD. On 3 August 2022, the American Catholic publishing house Ignatius Press announced they would be releasing a DVD for the film on 1 September 2022, under the English title The Siege of Vienna: September 11, 1683.

References

External links 

2010s adventure drama films
2012 independent films
2012 war drama films
2012 films
English-language Italian films
Drama films based on actual events
Fiction set in 1683
Films shot in Italy
Films shot in France
Films shot in Poland
Films shot in Romania
War epic films
Polish historical films
Polish war drama films
Films set in the Ottoman Empire
Italian historical films
Italian war drama films
Films set in the 1680s
Films directed by Renzo Martinelli
Siege films
Films
Films set in Belgrade
Films set in Vienna
Films set in Istanbul
2012 drama films
2010s English-language films